The Age of Remix Hell is a digital EP by American metal band Chimaira. The album was released for free online on December 24, 2011, through Multiupload.com.

Track listing

Personnel
 Mark Hunter – vocals, keyboards, samples
 Rob Arnold – lead guitar, rhythm guitar, bass guitar
 Ben Schigel – drums

References

Chimaira albums
2011 EPs
Remix EPs